Rhombopsammia is a genus of stony corals in the family Micrabaciidae commonly known as button corals.

Species
The World Register of Marine Species currently lists the following species:
 Rhombopsammia niphada Owens, 1986
 Rhombopsammia squiresi Owens, 1986

References

Scleractinia genera
Micrabaciidae